Alison Marie Xamon (born 8 June 1969) is an Australian Greens politician who served two separate terms in the Western Australian Legislative Council.

Early life
Xamon was born in Mundaring, Western Australia

Xamon studied law and arts at Murdoch University, where she served as Education Vice President and then Guild President for the Murdoch University Student Guild.

After university, Xamon worked in the union movement for various white- and blue-collar unions, including the Australian Nurses Federation, the State School Teachers' Union of Western Australia, and the Communications, Electricians and Plumbers Union. In her time in the union movement, Alison worked as an Organizer, Industrial Officer, Women's Officer, and Equal Opportunity specialist.

She then went on to work as a lawyer, with an interest in both public interest law and the right for people to access justice. She also sat on numerous boards within the community law and social justice sectors.

From 2007 to 2008 Xamon, was the National Convenor of the Australian Greens.

Political career
She was elected to parliament at the 2008 state election as a Greens member of the Western Australian Legislative Council representing East Metropolitan Region. Xamon introduced six private members bills during her term in parliament.

At the March 2013 Western Australian election, she was not re-elected.

Post-parliament, Xamon worked as an advocate for mental health and suicide prevention. She was elected as the President of the WA Association for Mental Health, the Vice-Chair of Community Mental Health Australia, and the Board of Mental Health Australia.

Xamon was also appointed to the WA Ministerial Council for Suicide Prevention, and as the inaugural Co-Lead of the Department of Health Statewide Mental Health Network.

Xamon was re-elected to the Legislative Council representing the North Metropolitan Region at the 2017 election. Her term began on 22 May 2017. She was defeated in 2021.

References

1969 births
Living people
Australian Greens members of the Parliament of Western Australia
Members of the Western Australian Legislative Council
Murdoch University alumni
Politicians from Perth, Western Australia
21st-century Australian politicians
21st-century Australian women politicians
Women members of the Western Australian Legislative Council